Ngāti Te Whatuiāpiti, Ngāti Te Whatu-i-āpiti or Ngāi Te Whatuiāpiti is a Māori hapū (subtribe or branch) of the Ngāti Kahungunu iwi in Hawke's Bay, New Zealand.

The hapū were descended from Te Whatuiāpiti, who was a great-grandson of Taewhā, himself a son of Rākei-hikuroa, the grandson of Kahungunu, and his second wife. Ngāi Whatuiāpiti had a fierce rivalry with Ngāi Te Upokoiri, which was descended from Taraia, a son of Rākei-hikuroa and his first wife.

Marae and wharenui

Central Hawke's Bay District
The hapū is associated with three marae (meeting grounds) and wharenui (meeting houses) in Central Hawke's Bay District:

 Mataweka marae and Nohomaiterangi wharenui on Tapairu Road at Waipawa
 Pukehou marae and Keke Haunga wharenui on State Highway 2 at Pukehou
 Te Whatuiāpiti marae and Te Whatuiāpiti wharenui on Te Aute Trust Road in the Pātangata area and north-east of Ōtāne

Hastings District
The hapū is associated with two marae (meeting grounds) and wharenui (meeting houses) in Hastings District:

 Kahurānaki marae and wharenui on State Highway 2 at Te Hauke 
 Korongatā marae and Nukanoa wharenui on Maraekakaho Road at Bridge Pā

Notable people

 Hine-i-paketia, a tribal leader and land seller
 Te Hapuku, a tribal leader, farmer and assessor
 Te Pareihe, a tribal leader
 Hori Tupaea, a tribal leader and farmer

References

 
Iwi and hapū